The 2019 Bassetlaw District Council election took place on 2 May 2019 to elect all 48 members of Bassetlaw District Council in England. This was on the same day as other local elections.

The election resulted in the Labour Party retaining its control of the council with an increased majority. The Conservative Party suffered its worst defeat in Bassetlaw since 1973, winning only 5 seats of the 12 seats it was defending. Both Independents and Labour gained seats from the Conservatives. The Liberal Democrats gained a seat from Labour in East Retford West, the first Liberal Democrat elected in Bassetlaw since 2006.

Background

Bassetlaw is a shire district in Nottinghamshire, England. It is predominantly rural, with two towns: Worksop and Retford. The district was formed in 1974 by the Local Government Act 1972. Local Government in Nottinghamshire is organised on a two-tier basis, with local district councils responsible for local services such as housing, local planning and refuse collection and Nottinghamshire County Council responsible for "wide-area" services, including education, social services and public transport. Bassetlaw District Council has been controlled by Labour for most of its existence, except for a brief period from 2006 to 2011 when it was controlled by the Conservatives.

Bassetlaw District Council held local elections on 2 May 2019 along with other councils in England as part of the 2019 local elections. Bassetlaw is divided into 25 wards for electoral purposes, with each ward electing between one and three councillors. Until 2015, the council was elected by thirds, with district elections being held every year except the year in which elections to Nottinghamshire County Council took place. The council resolved in 2014 to hold all-out elections from 2015 onwards, with all 48 councillors elected in all-out elections every four years. Councillors defending their seats in this election were previously elected in 2015. At that election, Labour won a majority of seats and retained its control of the council, which it has controlled since 2011.

Result
The election resulted in the Labour Party retaining its control of the council

Ward results
Asterisks denote incumbent Councillors seeking re-election.

Beckingham

Blyth

Carlton

Clayworth

East Markham

East Retford East

East Retford North

East Retford South

East Retford West

Everton

Harworth

Langold

Misterton

Rampton

Ranskill

Sturton

Sutton

Tuxford and Trent

Welbeck

Worksop East

Worksop North

Worksop North East

Worksop North West

Worksop South

Worksop South East

† Colin Barton was expelled from the Conservative Party in April 2019, however he remained a nominated Conservative candidate in this election as the deadline for withdrawals had passed.

By-elections
The Conservative Party have won 4 by elections in 2021, taking 2 seats from Labour Party and 1 seat from Independents . These by election results returned the Conservative Party to be the official opposition on Bassetlaw District Council.

Sutton (2022)
A by-election was held on 24 November 2022 due to the resignation of Denise Depledge (Conservative)

East Retford South

Ranskill

Sutton (2021)

Tuxford and Trent

References

2019 English local elections
2019
2010s in Nottinghamshire
May 2019 events in the United Kingdom